This is a list of public holidays in Sint Eustatius.

References

Lists of public holidays by country
Public holidays in the Netherlands
Sint Eustatius